Ancistrocerus nigricornis is a species of potter wasp.

Distribution
This species is present in most of Europe and in the eastern Palearctic realm, in the Near East, in North Africa, and in the Oriental realm.

Habitat
These potter wasps live in wet meadows, in open landscapes, sometimes in gardens and in areas where their feeding and preferred nesting sites are present.

Description

 These medium-sized solitary wasps are yellow and black, with brown hairs on thorax, small spots at the base of the front wings and wing stigma.

Metasomal terga III–IV show apical bands. In the females the spot between antennal socket and eye is absent.

Biology
This species has a single annual generation (univoltine). Adults emerge in late summer. Males can be seen from June until September, while females have been recorded from February to October. After mating the males die and the females overwinter and reappear in the spring. As adults, they eat plant juices, honeydew larvae and nectar of various flowers, mainly wild angelica (Angelica sylvestris), hogweed (Heracleum), blackberry (Rubus fruticosus), nightshades (Solanaceae), goldenrod (Solidago) and thistle.

Nest building occurs during the spring and early summer. These nest consist of holes in wood or tubes, commonly in elder and bramble stems, with clay partitions. These potter wasps lay an egg in each cell where they put various paralysed small caterpillars of micromoths, mainly Tortricidae. When the eggs hatch the larvae consume the prey.

Bibliography
 Antonio Giordani Soika (1970) Boll.Mus.Civ.Stor.nat.Venezia Contributo alla conoscenza degli Eumenidi del Medio Oriente. Missione Giordani Soika in Iran 1965, III., Volume: 20-21 Pages: 27-183
 Horst-Günter Woydak (2001) Natur und Heimat Die solitären Faltenwespen: Eumenidae (Lehmwespen) und Masaridae (Honigwespen im Westfälischen Museum für Naturkunde Münster, Volume: 61 Pages: 85-95
 Michael E. Archer (2002) Yorkshire Naturalists Union The wasps, ants and bees (Hymenoptera: aculeata) of Watsonian Yorkshire, Pages: 1-200
 Michael Kuhlmann (2002) NachrBl.bayer.Ent. Struktur der Wildbienen- und Wespenzönosen ausgewählter Waldstandorte, Volume: 51 Pages: 61-74
 Volker Haeseler (2003) Oldenburger Jb. Ameisen, Wespen und Bienen der Weserinsel Harriersand bei Bremen, Volume: 103 Pages: 333-363
 ZOBODAT: Zoological-Botanical Database (Vespoidea). Gusenleitner J., 2006-07-20

References

External links
 Naturspaziergang
 Insectoid

Potter wasps
Insects described in 1826